The Uma Oya Hydropower Complex (also internally called Uma Oya Multipurpose Development Project or UOMDP) is a irrigation and hydroelectric complex currently under construction in the Badulla District of Sri Lanka. Early assessments of project dates back to 1989, when the first studies was conducted by the country's Central Engineering and Consultancy Bureau. The complex involves building a dam across Dalgolla Oya, and channelling water over a  tunnel to Mathatilla Oya, both of which are tributaries of the Uma Oya. At Mathatilla Oya, another dam is constructed to channel  of water per annum, via a  headrace tunnel to the Uma Oya Power Station, where water then discharged to the Alikota Aru via a  tailrace tunnel. The Alikota Aru is a tributary of the Kirindi Oya.

The construction of the complex was inaugurated in April 2008 by former President Mahinda Rajapaksa and President Mahmoud Ahmadinejad.

History 
In 2008 Sri Lankan government began the project with Iranian funding and the foundation stone for the project without obtaining Environmental Clearance for the project. Environmental Impact Assessment (EIA) Report of the Uma Oya Project was prepared by the University of Sri Jayawardhanapura and was submitted in November 2010. During the 30 working days the EIA was open to the public for review and comments Central Environmental Authority received many letters from environmental organizations who called the EIA inadequate. However despite the objections CEP gave clearance for the project.

Puhulpola Dam 

Dyraaba Dam 

Uma Oya Power Station 

Impact 
The project is considered as one of the worst environmental disasters in Sri Lanka. It has been called the "Multi-destructive" project due its large negative effects. As a result of the project houses began collapsing, land surfaces cracking, wells and brooks drying up, residents being displaced and losing their traditional livelihood. Many mass protests were launched against the project by residents affected by the Uma Oya disaster.

It was revealed that impact of this Uma Oya project mainly because of bad Environmental Impact Assessment (EIA) report.  The Rajapaksa regime has also been accused of corruption in the project. Critics have accused that Rajapaksa used the project as a cover up to misuse funds. The costs of the project was increased by USD 248 million which resulted in the Irrigation ministry secretary who refused to sign the agreement resigning and his successor started the project despite heavy opposition.

Uma Oya Project temporary stop under Ranil Wikramasinghle Government. Due to the delay of contraction of Uma Oya Power Station, Government had to impose four hours per day power cuts & sign agreement to purchase electricity from private sector at huge cost.

See also 
 Electricity in Sri Lanka

References

External links 
 
 
 
 
 
 
 
 

Water supply and sanitation in Sri Lanka
Dams in Sri Lanka
Hydroelectric power stations in Sri Lanka